Melrose is a historic home located in the Murfreesboro Historic District at Murfreesboro, Hertford County, North Carolina.  It was built about 1805, as a two-story, Federal style brick dwelling with a gable roof and interior end chimneys.  Two-story, two bay, Greek Revival style wings were added in the mid-19th century. It is seven bays wide and features a tetrastyle portico supported by Ionic order columns and a Second story semi-circular balcony. It was built by Congressman William H. Murfree (1781 – 1827), son of Hardy Murfree (1752 – 1809).

It was listed on the National Register of Historic Places in 1971.

Gallery

References

Historic American Buildings Survey in North Carolina
Houses on the National Register of Historic Places in North Carolina
Federal architecture in North Carolina
Greek Revival houses in North Carolina
Houses completed in 1805
Houses in Hertford County, North Carolina
National Register of Historic Places in Hertford County, North Carolina
1805 establishments in North Carolina
Buildings and structures in Murfreesboro, North Carolina